Progon was the first Albanian ruler known by name, an archon of the Kruja Fortress (modern Krujë) and its surroundings, known as the Principality of Arbanon. He ruled between 1190 and 1198. Progon was succeeded by his two sons, Gjin, and Dimitri.

Life
Progon's realm was the first Albanian state during the Middle Ages. Little is known about archon Progon who was the first ruler of Kruja and its surroundings, between 1190 and 1198. The Kruja fortress stayed in the possession of the Progon family, and Progon was succeeded by his sons Gjin, and later Dimitri. Before 1204, Arbanon was an autonomous principality of the Byzantine Empire. He is mentioned with his two sons in an inscription from the St. Mary Monastery in Trifandina, Gëziq, northern Albania. The titles archon (held by Progon) and panhypersebastos (held by Dimitri) is a sign of Byzantine dependence.

Family
Progon (founder), archon of Kruja  ruled (between 1190 and 1198)
Gjin Progoni, ruled 1198–1208
Dimitri Progoni, ruled 1208–1216, married Komnena Nemanjić, the daughter of Serbian Grand Prince, later King Stefan Nemanjić (r. 1196–1228). This resulted in an alliance, and vassalage to Serbia amidst conflicts with the Republic of Venice.

Annotations

References

Sources

Kristo Frashëri (1964), The history of Albania: a brief survey. Publisher: s.n.
John Clements (1992), Clements' encyclopedia of world governments, Volume 10, Publisher: Political Research, inc.
Donald MacGillivray Nicol (1986), Studies in late Byzantine history and prosopography Volume 242 of Collected studies Variorum reprints ; CS242 Volume 242 of Variorum reprint. Illustrated edition. Variorum Reprints, 9780860781905
Donald MacGillivray Nicol (1957), The despotate of Epiros, Blackwell
Thalóczy-Jireček-Sufflay (1913), Acta et diplomata res Albaniae mediae aetatis illustrantia: Collegerunt et digesserunt dr Ludovicus de Thalóczy, dr Constantinus Jireček et dr Emilianus de Sufflay, Volume 1, Editors: Lajos Thallóczy, Konstantin Jireček, Emil von Sufflay. Publisher: typis A. Holzhausen
Anamali, Skënder and Prifti, Kristaq. Historia e popullit shqiptar në katër vëllime. Botimet Toena, 2002, 
The Late Medieval Balkans: A Critical Survey from the Late Twelfth Century to the Ottoman Conquest Author John Van Antwerp Fine Edition reprint, illustrated Publisher University of Michigan Press, 1994 , 9780472082605
Fontes  Fontes, Catholic Church. Pontificia Commissio Codici Iuris Canonici Orientalis Recognoscendo  Author	Catholic Church. Pontificia Commissio Codici Iuris Canonici Orientalis Recognoscendo  Publisher	Typis polyglottis Vaticanis, 1943
Zogo ve Atatürk  Author Tayfun Atmaca  Publisher Tayfun Atmaca, 2007 , 9789759421519
David Abulafia, The New Cambridge Medieval History: c. 1198-c. 1300

Arshi Pipa, Sami Repishti, Studies on Kosova, East European Monographs, 1984
Peter Jordan, Karl Kaser, Walter Lukan, Stephanie Schwandner-Sievers, Holm Sundhaussen, Albanien: Geographie - historische Anthropologie - Geschichte - Kultur - postkommunistische Transformation, Peter Lang, 2003
Steven G. Ellis,Lud'a Klusáková, Imagining frontiers, contesting identities

12th-century births
1198 deaths
Albanian monarchs
Albanian princes
12th-century Byzantine people
12th-century Albanian people
Progon
Medieval Albanian nobility